This is a list of the mammal species recorded in Bhutan. There are ninety mammal species in Bhutan, of which one is critically endangered, ten are endangered, fourteen are vulnerable, and three are near threatened.

The following tags are used to highlight each species' conservation status as assessed by the International Union for Conservation of Nature:

Order: Artiodactyla (even-toed ungulates) 

The even-toed ungulates are ungulates whose weight is borne about equally by the third and fourth toes, rather than mostly or entirely by the third as in perissodactyls. There are about 220 artiodactyl species, including many that are of great economic importance to humans.
Family: Bovidae (cattle, antelope, sheep, goats)
Subfamily: Bovinae
Genus: Bos
Gaur, B. gaurus 
Genus: Bubalus
Wild water buffalo, B. arnee 
Subfamily: Caprinae
Genus: Budorcas
Takin, B. taxicolor 
Bhutan takin, B. t. whitei
Genus Capricornis
Mainland serow, C. sumatraensis 
Genus: Hemitragus
Himalayan tahr, H. jemlahicus 
Genus: Nemorhaedus
Himalayan goral, N. goral 
Genus: Ovis
Argali, O. ammon  presence uncertain
Genus: Pseudois
Bharal, P. nayaur 
Family: Moschidae
Genus: Moschus
Alpine musk deer, M. chrysogaster 
Black musk deer, M. fuscus 
Family: Cervidae (deer)
Subfamily: Cervinae
Genus: Axis
Chital, A. axis 
Indian hog deer, A. porcinus 
Genus: Cervus
Wapiti, C. canadensis 
Genus: Rucervus
Barasingha, R. duvaucelii 
Genus Rusa
Sambar deer, R. unicolor 
Subfamily: Muntiacinae
Genus: Muntiacus
Indian muntjac, M. muntjak 
Family: Suidae (pigs)
Subfamily: Suinae
Genus: Porcula
Pygmy hog, P. salvanius  presence uncertain
Genus: Sus
Wild boar, S. scrofa

Order: Carnivora (carnivorans) 

There are over 260 species of carnivorans, the majority of which eat meat as their primary dietary item. They have a characteristic skull shape and dentition.
Suborder: Feliformia
Family: Felidae (cats)
Subfamily: Felinae
Genus: Catopuma
Asian golden cat, C. temminckii 
Genus: Felis
Jungle cat, F. chaus 
Genus: Lynx
Eurasian lynx, L. lynx 
Genus: Otocolobus
Pallas's cat, O. manul 
Genus: Pardofelis
Marbled cat, P. marmorata 
Genus: Prionailurus
Leopard cat, P. bengalensis 
Subfamily: Pantherinae
Genus: Neofelis
Clouded leopard, N. nebulosa 
Genus: Panthera
Leopard, P. pardus 
Tiger, P. tigris 
Snow leopard, P. uncia 
Family: Viverridae
Subfamily: Paradoxurinae
Genus: Arctictis
Binturong, A. binturong 
Genus: Paguma
Masked palm civet, P. larvata 
Genus: Paradoxurus
Asian palm civet, P. hermaphroditus  
Subfamily: Prionodontinae
Genus: Prionodon
Spotted linsang, P. pardicolor 
Subfamily: Viverrinae
Genus: Viverra
Large Indian civet, V. zibetha 
Genus: Viverricula
Small Indian civet, V. indica 
Family: Herpestidae (mongooses)
Genus: Urva
Indian grey mongoose, U. edwardsii 
Small Indian mongoose, U. auropunctata 
Crab-eating mongoose, U. urva 
Suborder: Caniformia
Family: Ailuridae (lesser panda)
Genus: Ailurus
Red panda, A. fulgens 
Family: Canidae (dogs, foxes)
Genus: Canis
Golden jackal, C. aureus 
Indian jackal, C. a. indicus
Gray wolf, C. lupus 
Himalayan wolf, C. l. chanco 
Genus: Cuon
Dhole, C. alpinus 
Genus: Vulpes
Bengal fox, V. bengalensis 
Red fox, V. vulpes 
Family: Ursidae (bears)
Genus: Melursus
Sloth bear, M. ursinus 
Genus: Ursus
Brown bear, U. arctos  possibly extirpated
Himalayan brown bear, U. a. isabellinus  possibly extirpated
Asiatic black bear, U. thibetanus 
Himalayan black bear, U. t. laniger 
Family: Mustelidae (mustelids)
Genus: Aonyx
Asian small-clawed otter, A. cinereus 
Genus: Arctonyx
Northern hog badger, A. albogularis  presence uncertain
Genus: Lutra
Eurasian otter, L. lutra 
Genus: Lutrogale
Smooth-coated otter, L. perspicillata 
Genus: Martes
Yellow-throated marten, M. flavigula 
Beech marten, M. foina  
Genus: Mustela
Mountain weasel, M. altaica 
Yellow-bellied weasel, M. kathiah  
Siberian weasel, M. sibirica 
Back-striped weasel, M. strigidorsa

Order: Cetacea (whales) 

The order Cetacea includes whales, dolphins, and porpoises. They are the mammals most fully adapted to aquatic life with a spindle-shaped nearly hairless body, protected by a thick layer of blubber, and forelimbs and tail modified to provide propulsion underwater.
Suborder: Odontoceti
Superfamily: Platanistoidea
Family: Platanistidae
Genus: Platanista
Ganges river dolphin, P. gangetica  presence uncertain

Order: Chiroptera (bats) 

The bats' most distinguishing feature is that their forelimbs are developed as wings, making them the only mammals capable of flight. Bat species account for about 20% of all mammals.
Family: Pteropodidae (flying foxes, Old World fruit bats)
Subfamily: Pteropodinae
Genus: Cynopterus
Greater short-nosed fruit bat, C. sphinx
Genus: Sphaerias
Blanford's fruit bat, S. blanfordi 
Genus: Pteropus
Indian flying fox, P. giganteus 
Family: Vespertilionidae
Subfamily: Myotinae
Genus: Myotis
Lesser mouse-eared bat, M. blythii 
Whiskered myotis, M. muricola
Himalayan whiskered bat, M. siligorensis
Subfamily: Vespertilioninae
Genus: Hesperoptenus
Tickell's bat, Hesperoptenus tickelli
Genus: Pipistrellus
Indian pipistrelle, Pipistrellus coromandra
Genus: Scotozous
Dormer's bat, S. dormeri 
Subfamily: Murininae
Genus: Murina
Round-eared tube-nosed bat, Murina cyclotis
Subfamily: Miniopterinae
Genus: Miniopterus
Small bent-winged bat, Miniopterus pusillus
Family: Molossidae
Genus: Chaerephon
Wrinkle-lipped free-tailed bat, Chaerephon plicata
Family: Rhinolophidae
Subfamily: Rhinolophinae
Genus: Rhinolophus
Intermediate horseshoe bat, Rhinolophus affinis
Pearson's horseshoe bat, Rhinolophus pearsoni

Order: Lagomorpha 

The lagomorphs comprise two families, Leporidae (hares and rabbits), and Ochotonidae (pikas). Though they can resemble rodents, and were classified as a superfamily in that order until the early 20th century; they have since been considered a separate order. They differ from rodents in a number of physical characteristics, such as having four incisors in the upper jaw rather than two.
Family: Leporidae (hares and rabbits)
Genus: Caprolagus
Hispid hare, C. hispidus 
Genus: Lepus
Indian hare, L. nigricollis  presence uncertain
Woolly hare, L. oiostolus 
Family: Ochotonidae (pikas)
Genus: Ochotona
 Plateau pika, O. curzoniae 
 Forrest's pika, O. forresti 
 Glover's pika, O. gloveri 
 Large-eared pika, O. macrotis 
 Nubra pika, O. nubrica 
 Royle's pika, O. roylei 
 Moupin pika, O. thibetana

Order: Pholidota (pangolins) 

Scaly anteaters, or pangolins, are armored with large, overlapping scales made of matted hair. There are approximately seven species of pangolin, of which two occur in Bhutan. Pangolins lack teeth, and eat only ants and termites with the assistance of a long sticky tongue.

Family: Manidae (pangolins)
Genus: Manis
Indian pangolin, M. crassicaudata 
Chinese pangolin, M. pentadactyla

Order: Perissodactyla (odd-toed ungulates) 

The odd-toed ungulates are browsing and grazing mammals. They are usually large to very large, and have relatively simple stomachs and a large middle toe.
Family: Rhinocerotidae
Genus: Rhinoceros
Indian rhinoceros, R. unicornis

Order: Primates 

The order Primates contains humans and their closest relatives: lemurs, lorisoids, monkeys, and apes.
Suborder: Strepsirrhini
Infraorder: Lemuriformes
Superfamily: Lorisoidea
Family: Loridae
Genus: Nycticebus
Bengal slow loris, N. bengalensis 
Suborder: Haplorhini
Infraorder: Simiiformes
Parvorder: Catarrhini
Superfamily: Cercopithecoidea
Family: Cercopithecidae (Old World monkeys)
Genus: Macaca
Assam macaque, M. assamensis 
Rhesus macaque, M. mulatta 
Subfamily: Colobinae
Genus: Semnopithecus
Nepal gray langur, S. schistaceus 
Genus: Trachypithecus
 Gee's golden langur, T. geei 
 Capped langur, T. pileatus

Order: Proboscidea (elephants) 

The elephants comprise three living species and are the largest living land animals.

Family: Elephantidae (elephants)
Genus: Elephas
Asian elephant, E. maximus

Order: Rodentia (rodents) 

Rodents make up the largest order of mammals, with over 40% of mammalian species. They have two incisors in the upper and lower jaw which grow continually and must be kept short by gnawing.
Suborder: Sciurognathi
Family: Sciuridae (squirrels)
Subfamily: Ratufinae
Genus: Ratufa
 Black giant squirrel, Ratufa bicolor
Subfamily: Sciurinae
Tribe: Pteromyini
Genus: Belomys
 Hairy-footed flying squirrel, Belomys pearsonii
Genus: Hylopetes
 Particolored flying squirrel, Hylopetes alboniger EN
Genus: Petaurista
 Bhutan giant flying squirrel, Petaurista nobilis
Subfamily: Callosciurinae
Genus: Callosciurus
 Irrawaddy squirrel, Callosciurus pygerythrus LC
Genus: Tamiops
 Himalayan striped squirrel, Tamiops macclellandi
Family: Spalacidae
Subfamily: Rhizomyinae
Genus: Cannomys
 Lesser bamboo rat, Cannomys badius
Family: Cricetidae
Subfamily: Arvicolinae
Genus: Microtus
 Sikkim mountain vole, Microtus sikimensis
Family: Muridae (mice, rats, voles, gerbils, hamsters)
Subfamily: Murinae
Genus: Mus
Gairdner's shrewmouse, Mus pahari 
Earth-colored mouse, M. terricolor 
Genus: Rattus
 Himalayan field rat, Rattus nitidus
 Sikkim rat, Rattus sikkimensis VU

Order: Soricomorpha (shrews, moles, and solenodons) 

The "shrew-forms" are insectivorous mammals. The shrews and solenodons closely resemble mice while the moles are stout-bodied burrowers.
Family: Soricidae (shrews)
Subfamily: Crocidurinae
Genus: Crocidura
 Grey shrew, Crocidura attenuata
 Southeast Asian shrew, Crocidura fuliginosa
 Horsfield's shrew, Crocidura horsfieldi
Genus: Suncus
 Etruscan shrew, S. etruscus 
Asian house shrew, S. murinus 
Subfamily: Soricinae
Tribe: Anourosoricini
Genus: Anourosorex
 Mole shrew, Anourosorex squamipes
Tribe: Nectogalini
Genus: Chimarrogale
 Himalayan water shrew, Chimarrogale himalayica
Genus: Nectogale
 Elegant water shrew, Nectogale elegans
Genus: Sorex
 Eurasian pygmy shrew, S. minutus 
Genus: Soriculus
 Bailey's shrew, Soriculus baileyi
 Hodgson's brown-toothed shrew, Soriculus caudatus
 Long-tailed brown-toothed shrew, Soriculus leucops
 Long-tailed mountain shrew, Soriculus macrurus
 Himalayan shrew, Soriculus nigrescens
Family: Talpidae (moles)
Subfamily: Talpinae
Tribe: Talpini
Genus: Euroscaptor
 Himalayan mole, Euroscaptor micrura

Locally extinct 
The following species are locally extinct in the country:
Wild yak, Bos mutus

See also
List of chordate orders
List of prehistoric mammals
Lists of mammals by region
Mammal classification
Mammals discovered in the 2000s

References

External links

 
Mammals
Bhutan
 Bhutan
Bhutan